Ganot Hadar (lit. Citrus Gardens) is a community settlement in central Israel. Located in the Sharon plain, it falls under the jurisdiction of Lev HaSharon Regional Council.

History
The village was founded in 1954 and was designated for immigrants from South Africa. Its name was derived from the surrounding groves.

References

Community settlements
Populated places established in 1954
Populated places in Central District (Israel)
1950 establishments in Israel
South African-Jewish culture in Israel